The Guitar of Gardel (Spanish:La guitarra de Gardel) is a 1949 Argentine-Spanish musical film directed by León Klimovsky and starring Agustín Irusta, Carmen Sevilla and Antonio Casal. The film is based on the life of the tango star Carlos Gardel.

Cast

References

Bibliography
 William Washabaugh. The Passion of Music and Dance. Berg, 1998.

External links 

1949 films
Argentine musical films
Spanish musical films
1949 musical films
1940s Spanish-language films
Films directed by León Klimovsky
Argentine black-and-white films
Spanish black-and-white films
1940s Argentine films